Sailendranath Sircar (also Sailendra Sircar; 1877–1942) was the fifth and the youngest son of Peary Charan Sircar, he was the founder head master of Swaraswati Institution, established in 1920, now renamed as Sailendra Sircar Vidyalaya, situated at north Kolkata. He was the head examiner in English under Calcutta University, and a Gold Medalist of the University.

1877 births
1942 deaths
Bengali people
University of Calcutta alumni
Academic staff of the University of Calcutta
20th-century Indian educational theorists
Writers from Kolkata
Founders of Indian schools and colleges